Beit She'arim may refer to:

Beit She'arim (Roman-era Jewish village)
Sheikh Bureik, the Palestinian village which succeeded the above
Beit She'arim (moshav), a village in Israel
Beit She'arim National Park, a park centred around the necropolis of the Roman-era Jewish village